Beetlejuice is a musical with music and lyrics by Eddie Perfect and book by Scott Brown and Anthony King. It is based on the 1988 film of the same name. The story concerns a deceased couple who try to haunt the new inhabitants of their former home and call for help from a devious bio-exorcist ghost named Betelgeuse (after the star; the name is pronounced and often spelled "Beetlejuice"), who is summoned by saying his name three times. One of the new inhabitants is a young girl, Lydia, who is dealing with her mother's death and her neglectful father.

The musical had a tryout at the National Theatre, Washington, D.C. in October 2018, prior to opening on Broadway at the Winter Garden Theatre on April 25, 2019. It is produced by Warner Bros. Theatre Ventures (a unit of franchise owner Warner Bros.). Due to the COVID-19 pandemic, the show played its final performance at the Winter Garden on March 10, 2020. It reopened at the Marquis Theatre on Broadway on April 8, 2022, and closed on January 8, 2023; a US national tour of the production began in December 2022.

Background 
In 2016, a musical adaptation of the 1988 film Beetlejuice (directed by Tim Burton and starring Geena Davis as Barbara Maitland, Alec Baldwin as Adam Maitland, Winona Ryder as Lydia Deetz and Michael Keaton as Beetlejuice) was reported to be in the works, directed by Alex Timbers and produced by Warner Bros., following a reading with Christopher Fitzgerald in the title role. In March 2017, it was reported that Australian musical comedian Eddie Perfect would be writing the music and lyrics and Scott Brown and Anthony King would be writing the book of the musical, and that another reading would take place in May, featuring Kris Kukul as musical director. The musical had three readings and two workshops with Alex Brightman in the title role, Sophia Anne Caruso as Lydia Deetz, and Kerry Butler and Rob McClure as Barbara and Adam Maitland.

Plot

Act I 
A group of people at a graveyard mourn the passing of Emily Deetz. Emily's daughter, Lydia, reflects on the death of her mother and her own inability to be noticed by her father, Charles ("Prologue: Invisible"). A millennia-old demon named Beetlejuice appears and mocks the idea of living life to the fullest, as it will all be worthless once death comes ("The Whole 'Being Dead' Thing"). Beetlejuice then addresses the audience directly, explaining that, as a demon, he is invisible to all living beings unless he gets a living person to say his name three times, and reveals that he has come up with a plan to accomplish this.

Beetlejuice then introduces Adam and Barbara Maitland. They are a normal married couple who desperately want to start a family, but are not emotionally ready and project their insecurities onto their hobbies. As the Maitlands reason to themselves why they are not ready for a child, they fall to their deaths through unstable floorboards in their home ("Ready, Set, Not Yet"). The Handbook for the Recently Deceased falls from the sky, but Beetlejuice burns it, wanting the newly deceased Maitlands to haunt their house and get a living person to say his name three times. When the Maitlands awaken from their fall and realize that they are dead, Beetlejuice reveals himself to the couple and offers to help them adjust to the Afterlife ("The Whole "Being Dead" Thing, Pt. 2"). He reveals to the Maitlands that a new family, the Deetzes, have bought their house and that in order to remain alone, they will have to scare them away, so the Maitlands accept his help ("The Whole "Being Dead" Thing, Pt. 3").

While moving in, Charles reveals to Lydia that he wants to start a gated community, using the house as a flagship model home, and is holding a dinner party with some business friends. Lydia expresses her desire for her mother to return, mentioning the fact that nobody seems to care that she is gone. Praying for her to send a sign that she is still there, Lydia vows to make her father acknowledge the fact that tragedy struck their family ("Dead Mom"). In the attic, Beetlejuice is trying to teach the Maitlands how to be scary. Despite his best attempts, they prove to be not scary at all ("Fright of Their Lives"). Beetlejuice becomes frustrated with the couple and abandons them, so they vow to scare the Deetz family away themselves ("Ready Set" (reprise)). Meanwhile, Delia, a woman who Charles hired to be Lydia's life coach and his secret lover, tells Lydia how everything happens for a reason, but fails to get her in a positive state of mind ("No Reason"). After their session, Lydia meets the Maitlands as they are roaming the house trying to scare the Deetzes. Lydia wants to leave the house just as much as the Maitlands want her family out, so she tries to convince her dad that the house is haunted, only to find out that he and Delia are engaged.

Feeling as if Charles is just trying to replace her mother, Lydia flees to the roof, where a depressed Beetlejuice laments that he will never be seen ("Invisible" (reprise)). He becomes ecstatic however when he realizes Lydia can see him and tries to convince her not to kill herself, with the intention of getting her to free him from his curse. Lydia teases Beetlejuice, but does not say his name. The Maitlands come to check on Lydia, only to be possessed by Beetlejuice into saying positive things about him to further convince Lydia. Upon learning about possession and that any ghost can do it, regardless of skill, Lydia decides not to work with Beetlejuice and instead work with the Maitlands to ruin Charles' party ("Say My Name").

At the dinner party, Barbara and Adam possess Charles, Delia and their guests ("Day-O (The Banana Boat Song)"). However, instead of being scared, the investors see the ghosts as a selling point; making them more interested in Charles' project. Feeling desperate, Lydia resorts to summoning Beetlejuice. Now visible to the living and able to affect the world around him, he forces the Maitlands to the attic before throwing Charles, Delia and the investors out of the house, much to Lydia's joy.

Act II 
A Girl Scout named Skye explains to the audience how she has a heart condition where anything shocking could stop her heart but that she is nevertheless excited to be a Girl Scout. She rings the doorbell of the Deetzes' house and is greeted by Lydia, who invites her inside ("Girl Scout"). However, Beetlejuice appears and frightens the poor girl into leaving. He summons more versions of himself to help Lydia scare every visitor that comes to the house ("That Beautiful Sound"). He also tells Lydia that since she lives and works among the dead now, she should also follow their rules, and gives her a copy of the Handbook for the Recently Deceased. But because she is not dead, Lydia cannot open it. Despite this, she realizes it could help her reunite with her mother, and runs to the attic for Barbara and Adam's help. Feeling alone and betrayed again, Beetlejuice talks with his clones about how he wants to leave the house to finally connect with people now that he can be seen. To achieve this, he decides to trick Lydia into marrying him, which will allow him to roam free in the living world ("That Beautiful Sound" (reprise)).

In the attic, Barbara and Adam help Lydia open the Handbook, when they realize they should have gone straight to the Netherworld instead of remaining in their house. Adam opens the door to the Netherworld, but Barbara shuts it and the Handbook, afraid of leaving the house. Lydia berates them because she hoped to use the book to summon her dead mother and leaves disappointed and angry. Barbara realizes that all of their fear has held her and Adam back, so they decide to become bolder and better people ("Barbara 2.0").

Delia, Charles, and Delia's guru, Otho, re-enter the house to rescue Lydia, bringing a box that can supposedly trap souls. Beetlejuice tricks Lydia by telling her that reading a passage from the book will resurrect her mother, but instead she unknowingly begins to exorcise Barbara and is forced to agree to marry Beetlejuice to stop it ("The Whole "Being Dead" Thing, Pt. 4"). He stops the exorcism and opens a door to the Netherworld to send the Maitlands away for good, but Lydia jumps through the door, with Charles following. Enraged that his plan has failed again, Beetlejuice decides to kill everyone instead ("Good Old Fashioned Wedding").

Lydia and Charles enter the Netherworld and are greeted by Miss Argentina, who along with other Netherworld residents, urges them to return to the living world ("What I Know Now"). They then meet Juno, director of Netherworld Customs and Processing, who soon finds out they are still alive. Lydia runs from Juno and frantically searches for her mother in the Netherworld, but is unable to find her. Charles finds Lydia in distress and reconciles with her ("Home").

The Deetzes return to the house, where Beetlejuice is preparing to kill everyone. Lydia plans to trick him by agreeing to marry him as Charles, Delia, and the Maitlands get the demon ready ("Creepy Old Guy"). The wedding brings Beetlejuice to life, allowing Lydia to stab him and kill him again, making him "Recently Deceased". Lydia and the Maitlands try to send him back to the Netherworld, but Juno appears, reveals herself as Beetlejuice's mother, and tries to take Lydia back with her. Beetlejuice stands up to Juno, having learned to appreciate life in his brief experience. Juno pretends to be moved by Beetlejuice's speech and throws him out of the house. The Maitlands, Charles, and Delia refuse to let Juno take Lydia. Beetlejuice then crashes through the wall riding a sand worm, which eats Juno.

Beetlejuice says his last goodbyes to everyone before leaving. The Deetzes and Maitlands rejoice in their victory and agree to share the house as they clean up and repair the damage. Lydia accepts that although her mother is gone, there is still so much left to enjoy in life ("Jump in the Line").

Notes

Roles and principal casts 

Notes

Musical numbers 

Act I
 "Prologue: Invisible" - Lydia and Ensemble
 "The Whole "Being Dead" Thing" – Beetlejuice and Ensemble
 "Ready, Set, Not Yet" – Adam and Barbara
 "The Whole "Being Dead" Thing, Pt. 2" – Beetlejuice and Ensemble
 "The Whole "Being Dead" Thing, Pt. 3" – Beetlejuice†
 "Dead Mom" – Lydia
 "Fright of Their Lives" – Beetlejuice, Adam, Barbara and Ensemble
 "Ready Set, Not Yet" (reprise) – Barbara and Adam
 "No Reason" – Delia and Lydia
 "Invisible" (reprise)/"On the Roof" – Beetlejuice
 "Say My Name" – Beetlejuice, Lydia, Barbara and Adam
 "Day-O (The Banana Boat Song)" – Delia, Charles, Maxie, Maxine and Ensemble‡

Act II
 "Girl Scout" – Skye
 "That Beautiful Sound" – Beetlejuice, Lydia and Ensemble
 "That Beautiful Sound" (reprise) – Beetlejuice and Ensemble†
 "Barbara 2.0" – Barbara and Adam
 "The Whole "Being Dead" Thing, Pt. 4" – Beetlejuice†
 "Good Old Fashioned Wedding" – Beetlejuice†
 "What I Know Now" - Miss Argentina and Ensemble
 "Home" - Lydia
 "Creepy Old Guy" – Lydia, Adam, Barbara, Beetlejuice, Charles, Delia and Ensemble
 "Jump in the Line (Shake, Senora)" / "Dead Mom" (reprise) / "Home" (reprise) / "Day-O" (reprise) – Lydia, Barbara, Adam, Delia and Charles‡

Keys

Productions

Washington D.C. (2018) 
The musical had a pre-Broadway tryout at the National Theatre in Washington, D.C. for a limited run from October 14 to November 18, 2018. The production was directed by Alex Timbers and choreographed by Connor Gallagher, with musical direction by Kris Kukul, scenic design by David Korins, costume design by William Ivey Long, lighting design by Kenneth Posner, sound design by Peter Hylenski, projection design Peter Nigrini, puppet design by Michael Curry, special effects by Jeremy Chernick, illusions by Michael Weber, music producing by Matt Stine and dance arrangements by David Dabbon. The cast included Alex Brightman in the title role alongside Sophia Anne Caruso as Lydia, Kerry Butler and Rob McClure as Barbara and Adam, Leslie Kritzer and Adam Dannheisser as Delia and Charles, Jill Abramovitz and Danny Rutigliano as Maxine and Maxie, and Kelvin Moon Loh as Otho.

Broadway (2019–2023) 

Beetlejuice premiered on Broadway at the Winter Garden Theatre with the same cast and creative team. Previews began on March 28, 2019, with an official opening night on April 25, 2019. David Josefsberg took over the role of Adam in September 2019, and understudy Presley Ryan took over the role of Lydia in February 2020 for the run's last two weeks. Due to a contractual commitment with the theatre to make room for a revival of The Music Man, the production was scheduled to close at the Winter Garden on June 6, 2020. However, after a total of 27 previews and 366 regular performances, the production played its last performance at the Winter Garden on March 10, 2020, before The Broadway League suspended performances of all Broadway productions because of the COVID-19 pandemic. The show released a successful cast album.

The production reopened at the Marquis Theatre on April 8, 2022, with Brightman returning in the title role and Butler, Josefsberg, Dannheisser, Kritzer, Loh, Rutigliano and Steingold reprising their roles. Elizabeth Teeter joined the cast as Lydia, with Michelle Aravena as Miss Argentina and Zonya Love as Maxine Dean/Juno. The production closed on January 8, 2023, after 679 performances and 27 previews.

The show began its US national tour at the Carson Center in Paducah, Kentucky, on December 1, 2022, with tour stops announced into October 2023. Justin Collette plays the title role, with Isabella Esler as Lydia, Britney Coleman as Barbara and Will Burton as Adam and Karmine Alers as Maxine; Timbers again directed and Gallagher choreographed.

South Korea (2021) 
Beetlejuice played in Seoul, South Korea, at the Sejong Center for the Performing Arts, in July and August 2021. Jung Sung-hwa and Yoo Jun-sang shared the title role.

Critical response 
Ben Brantley, in The New York Times, wrote: "Invisibility is definitely not among this show's problems; overcompensating from the fear that it might lose an audience with a limited attention span is. Though it features a jaw-droppingly well-appointed gothic funhouse set (by David Korins, lighted by Kenneth Posner), replete with spooky surprises, this show so overstuffs itself with gags, one-liners and visual diversions that you shut down from sensory overload."

Sara Holdren, in New York Vulture, wrote that the show "openly embraces the theme park-y aspects of an enterprise like the one it's engaged in. True to its source material, it's loud, it's cheeky, and it's all about excess. It's also – thanks in large part to Alex Brightman's spot-on performance as the incorrigible titular ghoul – a pretty fun time." Nick Romano from Entertainment Weekly commented that the musical "was crafted from a group of creative minds who clearly love the source material, though not all of it works. There are still second act problems and a song list void of any real bops, but it's a fun time for the Burton novice and pure fan service for the Burton stans, thanks in large part to the titular puckish undead spirit breathing life into a Broadway experiment that could've been dead in the water."

Peter Marks, theatre critic for The Washington Post, was pleased by the changes made during the show's transition to Broadway: "during its tryout run in November in Washington's National Theatre, the blithe, dizzily antic spirit of the movie was suffocating under the weight of sophomoric, phallic gags. This reworked incarnation, under Alex Timbers's direction, breathes slightly more enjoyably even as it remains too faithful to the pumped-up inclinations of book writers Scott Brown and Anthony King and composer-lyricist Eddie Perfect. This means that the eager-to-please quotient of a musical about the quest by a bevy of souls, alive and dead, to alleviate loneliness, is still amped up a bit too frantically. This may be of more concern to overly entertained theater analysts than to those musical-theater enthusiasts who thrive on the supercharged exertions of an ensemble on hyperdrive. On a measurement scale of energy-output-per-minute, high-octane Beetlejuice would now be the safest ticket in town."

Frank Rizzo wrote in Variety: "Keeping things entertaining enough are the off-the-wall humor, endless visuals and aural delights, tuneful music and wicked lyrics of Perfect... Brightman is matched in star presence and musical chops by Caruso, as she travels to hell and back without losing her way. McLure [sic] and Butler find big laughs, too, as the sweet – but not too sweet – a couple who finally find a reason to live after they've died. Dannheisser, as Lydia's dad, grounds the role with sincerity without forgoing the loopy side, too."

Recordings 
Ghostlight Records released the original Broadway cast recording digitally on June 7, 2019.

Ghostlight released Beetlejuice – The Demos! The Demos! The Demos! on October 30, 2020, compiling material composer-lyricist Perfect recorded between 2014 and 2019 during the development of the musical. It features both final and cut songs from the show as well as commentary by Perfect.

Awards and nominations

Broadway production

References

External links 
 Official website
 

2018 musicals
Musicals based on films
Beetlejuice
Broadway musicals
Works impacted by the COVID-19 pandemic